Michelangelo is a 230 km diameter impact basin in the Michelangelo quadrangle of Mercury, which is named after this crater. The crater itself was named by the IAU in 1979 after the Italian painter, sculptor and architect Michelangelo.

Michelangelo is one of 110 peak ring basins on Mercury.

References

Impact craters on Mercury